Kamyshlinsky District is an administrative and municipal district (raion), one of the twenty-seven in Samara Oblast, Russia. It is located in the northeast of the oblast. Its administrative center is the rural locality (a selo) of Kamyshla. Population: 11,420 (2010 Census);  The population of Kamyshla accounts for 42.8% of the district's total population.

History
The district was established on October 9, 1929 as Baytugansky Ethnic (Tatar) District. In 1937, it was renamed Kamyshlinsky. The district was abolished in the 1960s and re-created in its current form in 1991.

References

Notes

Sources

Districts of Samara Oblast

